Apterichtus is a genus of fish in the family Ophichthidae (snake eels). Many of its species are called finless eels.

Species
There are currently 18 recognized species in this genus:
 Apterichtus anguiformis (W. K. H. Peters, 1877) (Slender finless eel)
 Apterichtus ansp (J. E. Böhlke, 1968) (Academy finless eel)
 Apterichtus australis McCosker & J. E. Randall, 2005
 Apterichtus caecus (Linnaeus, 1758) (European finless eel)
 Apterichtus dunalailai McCosker & Hibino, 2015 
 Apterichtus equatorialis (G. S. Myers & Wade, 1941) (Equatorial finless eel)
 Apterichtus flavicaudus (Snyder, 1904)
 Apterichtus gracilis (Kaup, 1856)
 Apterichtus hatookai Hibino, Shibata & Kimura, 2014 (Orange-blotched finless eel) 
 Apterichtus jeffwilliamsi McCosker & Hibino, 2015 
 Apterichtus kendalli (C. H. Gilbert, 1891) (Western Atlantic finless eel)
 Apterichtus klazingai (M. C. W. Weber, 1913) (Sharp-snout finless eel)
 Apterichtus malabar McCosker & Hibino, 2015 
 Apterichtus monodi (C. Roux, 1966)
 Apterichtus moseri (D. S. Jordan & Snyder, 1901)
 Apterichtus mysi McCosker & Hibino, 2015 
 Apterichtus nariculus McCosker & Hibino, 2015 
 Apterichtus orientalis Machida & Ohta, 1994
 Apterichtus succinus Hibino, McCosker & Kimura, 2016

References

 
Ray-finned fish genera
Taxa named by André Marie Constant Duméril